Sang-e Sefid-e Nanaj (also Romanized as Sang-e Sefīd-e Nanaj; also known as Sangsefīd) is a village in Jowkar Rural District, Jowkar District, Malayer County, Hamadan Province, Iran. At the 2006 census, its population was 254, in 49 families.

References 

Populated places in Malayer County